Bhoe Asal , is a town and Union Council of Kasur District in the Punjab province of Pakistan. It is on Lahore-Karachi railway track and on Pattoki-Raiwind Road. It is very close to the Pakistan's biggest forest Changa Manga. It is a railway station as well situated among Kot Radha Kishan (KRK) and Changa Manga. Bhoe Asal is still deprived of Sui Gas. Dr. Riaz Ur Rehman Chughtai (former Head of Chemistry Department, Punjab University, Lahore) also belonged to Bhoe Asal. He was first PhD from the village who got PhD degree from England in 1954. Dr. Abdul Rahim Sajid (AR Sajid) is the second PhD of the town who earned PhD in Media & Communication Studies from Bahauddin Zakariya University Multan in 2018.Dr.NAQASH NOBLE HARRISON is the first pharmacist (pharm D) from this village done from The university of the Lahore and also done his MBBS from Russia.Dr. Rao Nouman Ali is the first urologist from this village he has earned his FCPS urology degree from CPSP Pakistan. Dr. Rao Faizan Ali also belonged from this village he is the first person who has earned PhD degree in Information Systems from Universiti Teknologi PETRONAS Malaysia, now working as an assistant professor in University of Management and Technology Lahore Pakistan.  Govt. High School Bhoe Asal has the honour that all of them studied here and one more Justice Manzoor Ahmad Malik who is judge of Supreme Court of Pakistan also remained student of this school.

References

Populated places in Kasur District